The 1908–09 Army Cadets men's basketball team represented United States Military Academy during the 1908–09 college men's basketball season. The head coach was Joseph Stilwell, coaching his fourth season with the Cadets. The team captain was Jacob Devers.

Schedule

|-

References

Army Black Knights men's basketball seasons
Army
Army Cadets Men's Basketball Team
Army Cadets Men's Basketball Team